Rocky Gorge Reservoir is located on the Patuxent River in Howard, Montgomery, and Prince George's counties in Maryland, between Laurel and Burtonsville. The reservoir was created in 1952 by the construction of the T. Howard Duckett Dam on the Patuxent. The dam is visible from Interstate 95 near milemarker 34. Because of its close association with a dam by the name, the reservoir is sometimes called the T. Howard Duckett Reservoir. The reservoir is maintained as a drinking water source by the Washington Suburban Sanitary Commission (WSSC).

WSSC provides recreational facilities to the public on portions of the Rocky Gorge property, including hiking, picnicking, fishing, boating, horseback riding, and hunting. Local fish species include pike and largemouth bass.

Namesake
T. Howard Duckett drafted the law officially establishing the WSSC as a permanent bicounty agency. Following lobbying by E. Brooke Lee, the law was passed, effective May 1, 1918. Duckett was named one of the three first official commissioners.

See also
Triadelphia Reservoir

References

External links

Washington Suburban Sanitary Commission
topo map

Burtonsville, Maryland
Chesapeake Bay watershed
Laurel, Maryland
Reservoirs in Maryland
Lakes of Howard County, Maryland
Lakes of Montgomery County, Maryland
Bodies of water of Prince George's County, Maryland
1952 establishments in Maryland